The 1908 North Dakota gubernatorial election was held on November 3, 1908. Incumbent Democrat John Burke defeated Republican nominee C. A. Johnson with 51.06% of the vote.

Primary elections
Primary elections were held on June 24, 1908.

Democratic primary

Candidates
John Burke, incumbent Governor

Results

Republican primary

Candidates
C. A. Johnson
T. Twichell

Results

General election

Candidates
Major party candidates
John Burke, Democratic
C. A. Johnson, Republican

Other candidates
L.F. Dow, Independent

Results

References

1908
North Dakota
Gubernatorial